Nepenthes holdenii is a tropical pitcher plant from western Cambodia, where it grows at elevations of 600–800 m above sea level. The species was originally known from only two peaks in the Cardamom Mountains, but the discovery of a new population was reported in October 2011. Seeds were collected in 2014 and the species was successfully introduced into cultivation.

References

Further reading

 Foges, R. 2010. New species of carnivorous plant discovered in Cambodia. Fauna & Flora International, November 15, 2010. 
 Guerini, M. 2011. 2010: new species of Carnivorous Plants. Associazione Italiana Piante Carnivore.
 Holden, J. 2012. What’s in a name – the perils of naming new species. Fauna & Flora International, February 3, 2012. 
 Hruby, D. 2010. Another carnivorous plant discovered. The Phnom Penh Post, November 15, 2010. 
 Mey, F.S. 2010. Introduction to the pitcher plants (Nepenthes) of Cambodia. Cambodian Journal of Natural History 2010(2): 106–117.
 Mey, F.S. 2010. Nepenthes holdenii. Strange Fruits: A Garden's Chronicle, October 31, 2010.
 Mey, F.S. 2010. Nepenthes holdenii and some ant-plants in the Cardamom mountains. Strange Fruits: A Garden's Chronicle, December 7, 2010.
 Mey, F.S. 2014. 'Nepenthes of Indochina', my 2010 ICPS lecture now on Youtube. Strange Fruits: A Garden's Chronicle, February 3, 2014.
 Mey, F.S. 2014. Paphiopedilum robinsonianum, a new species of slipper orchid from Sulawesi. Strange Fruits: A Garden's Chronicle, February 27, 2014.
 Carnivorous plant found by Cambridge conservationists. BBC News, November 15, 2010.

External links
Photographs of N. holdenii

Carnivorous plants of Asia
holdenii
Plants described in 2010
Endemic flora of Cambodia